Susan Atefat-Peckham (August 12, 1970, in New York City – February 7, 2004) was an Iranian-American poet.

Life
She graduated from the Baylor University, and University of Nebraska with her PhD in 1999, where she was an Editorial Assistant for Prairie Schooner.
She taught at the University of Nebraska-Lincoln, Hope College, where she was editor of Milkwood Review, and Georgia College & State University.

She and her son Cyrus were killed in an auto accident; her husband, Joel Peckham, mother, and youngest son Darius were hurt but survived.

Poetry
 "Dates"; "AMEH JOON", Nebraska Center for Writers

References

External links
 "An Interview With Poet Susan Atefat-Peckham", Poets & Writers

1970 births
2004 deaths
Baylor University alumni
University of Nebraska alumni
Writers from New York City
Georgia College & State University faculty
American women poets
American writers of Iranian descent
20th-century American poets
20th-century American women writers
Iranian women poets
20th-century Iranian women writers
20th-century Iranian poets
21st-century Iranian women writers
21st-century Iranian poets
American women academics
21st-century American women